England were the first of the Home Nations to tour Argentina, and to take advantage of the recent International Board (IB) ruling that full caps could be awarded for matches against non-IB countries. It had been the intention to tour Argentina in 1973, but terrorist threats had necessitated cancellation and the side had gone to Fiji and New Zealand instead.

Touring party

Manager: Derek Morgan
Assistant Manager: Mike Davis
Captain: Bill Beaumont (Fylde) 30 Caps

Matches
Complete list of matches played by England in Argentina:

 San Isidro Club: F.Argerich; F.Sainz Trápaga, M.Perez Coba, M.Loffrede, L.Corral (F.Aguirre); R.Madero, A.Soares Gache; T.Petersen, R.de Vedis (capt,), R.Lucke; C.Durlech, M.Glestra; C.Seinz Trápaga, J.Perez Cabo, F.Insus. 
England:  D.Hare; J.Carleton, C.Woodward, P.Dodge, A.Swift; J.Horton, S.Smith; N.Jeavana, J.Scott, M.Rafter; W.Beaumont (capt.), J.Fidler; C.Smart, A.Simpson, C.McGregar. 

Regional del Norte: G.Bustos (Córdoba); P.Bobadilla (Córdoba), R.Mas Dan (Córdoba), M.Ambroggio (Cordoba), Guran (Tucumán); G.Palau (Tucumán), R.Sauce (Tucumán); M.Martinez (Cordoba), R.Hyleveld (Cordoba), M.Espósito (Cordoba); E.Amador (Cordoba), R.Passaglia (Cordoba) (capt.); E.Rodríguez (Cordoba), H.Bianchi (Cordoba), J.Ferro (Tucumán), (A.Sanchez Salta)
England:  B.Patrick; D.Track, R.Dodge, N.Preston, J.Carleton; G.Davies, N.Melville; D.Cooke, J.Scott, R.Hesford; W.Beaumont (capt.), S.Bainbridge; P.Rendell (C.Smart), S.Milla, G.Pearce. 

 Buenos Aires: F.Argerich; A.Puccio (J.Palma), E.Sanguinetti, G.Lorenzo, F.Seinz Trápaga; G.Beccer Varela, A.Nicholson (capt.); J.Allen (C.Neyra), R.Sanz, R.De Vedia; M.Iachetti, M.Glastra; F.Insús, A.Courreges, P.Devoto. England:  W.Hare; J.Carleton, S.Woodward, P.Dodge, T.Swift; H.Davies, S.Smith; N.Jeavons, J.Scott, D.Cooke (B.Hesford); S.Baindridge, W.Beaumont (capt.); J.Smart, S.Milla, G.Pearce.

Combinado Sur: L.Elissando (Tandil); D.De Pau (Mar del Plata), V.Cutuk (Sur) G.Paulucci (Mar del Plata) R.Bonavita (Mar del Plata); G.Pedroza (Mar del Plata), A.Valderrey (Mar del Plata); 0.Varade (Mar del Plata), M.Riego (Mar del Plata), J.Feullassier (Mar del Plata); D.Rotelo (Mar del Plata), B.Minguez (Mar del Plata) (capt.); H.Bruno (Mar del Plata), R.Rovere (Tandil) (N.Bosso (Mar del Plata), J.Quaglia (Sur)
England: B.Patrick; J.Carleton, P.Dodge, N.Preston, D.Trick; J.Hartan, N.Melville; M.Rafter (capt.), R.Hesford, N.Jeavons; S.Bainbridge, J.Fidler;

First test 

Regional del Litoral D.Baetti; A.Piscione; J.Escalante, A.Trini, D.Giner; M.Dip, R.Cestagna; C.Marengo, V.Macet, G.Minoldo (J.Comba); G.Milano, J.Mangimelli (capt.); C.Fernández, C.Cristini, A.Risler. England:  B.Patrick; J.Carleton, P.Dodge, N.Prestan, D.Trick; P.Horton, N.Melville; R.Hesford, D.Cocke, N.Jeavons; S.Bainbridge, W.Beaumont (capt.); G.Pearce, A.Simpson, C.McGregor.

Second test

Notes

References 

1981 rugby union tours
1981
Argentina
1981 in Argentine sport